This is a list of notable stews. A stew is a combination of solid food ingredients that have been cooked in liquid and served in the resultant gravy. Ingredients in a stew can include any combination of vegetables (such as carrots, potatoes, beans, onions, peppers, tomatoes, etc.), and frequently with meat (especially tougher meats suitable for moist slow-cooking) such as beef. Poultry, pork, lamb or mutton, sausages, and seafood are also used.

Stews

Unsorted
 Capra e fagioli
 Ginataang kalabasa
 Ginataang labong
 Kokotxas
 Kontomire stew
 Or lam
 Pepián
 Waknatoy

See also

 Fish stew – includes a list of many fish stews
 List of Azerbaijani soups and stews
 List of fish and seafood soups
 List of Japanese soups and stews
 List of soups
 List of Spanish soups and stews

References